The Very Best of Linda Ronstadt is a hits compilation by American singer/songwriter/producer Linda Ronstadt.  The album was released by Rhino Records in 2002.

It peaked at #19 on Billboards Country albums chart - where it lasted for well over a year - and crossed over to #165 on Billboard'''s main album chart. In 2003, a European edition was released with additional and alternate tracks.

In 2012, Rolling Stone ranked The Very Best of Linda Ronstadt'' at number 164 on the magazine's list of The 500 Greatest Albums of All Time.

A new Australian edition of the disc was released in 2017 and hit the ARIA Charts. It was certified Gold in Australia.

Track listing

American version

International version

Chart performance

Certifications

References

2002 greatest hits albums
Linda Ronstadt compilation albums
Albums produced by Peter Asher
Albums produced by John Boylan (record producer)
Albums produced by Nick Venet
Rhino Records compilation albums